Mohammad Nabi Safi also known as "Rahimullah", is deputy governor of Kapisa Province, Afghanistan.

References

Living people
Year of birth missing (living people)
Place of birth missing (living people)
People from Kapisa Province